Armstrong Siddeley was a British engineering group that operated during the first half of the 20th century. It was formed in 1919 and is best known for the production of luxury vehicles and aircraft engines.

The company was created following the purchase by Armstrong Whitworth of Siddeley-Deasy, a manufacturer of fine motor cars that were marketed to the top echelon of society. After the merge of companies, this focus on quality continued throughout in the production of cars, aircraft engines, gearboxes for tanks and buses, rocket and torpedo motors, and the development of railcars. Company mergers and takeovers with Hawker Aviation and Bristol Aero Engines saw the continuation of the car production which ceased in August 1960.

The company was absorbed into the Rolls-Royce conglomerate which was interested in the aircraft and aircraft engine business. Eventually, the remaining spares and all motor car interests were sold to the Armstrong Siddeley Owners Club Ltd, which now owns the patents, designs, copyrights and trademarks, including the name Armstrong Siddeley.

Considered "an elegant car appropriate for royal use", the "Armstrong Siddeley Saloon" was used by the Prince of Wales (later King Edward VIII) during his 1930 tour of Uganda.

History

Siddeley Autocar

The Siddeley Autocar Company, of Coventry, was founded by John Davenport Siddeley (1866–1953) in 1902. Its products, made for him by a Vickers subsidiary, were heavily based on Peugeots using many Peugeot parts and fitted with English-built bodies. J. D. Siddeley was appointed London sales manager of Vickers Limited's subsidiary Wolseley in early 1905 at the same time as Wolseley purchased the goodwill and patent rights of his Siddeley car. A few months later Herbert Austin left to form his own business and Siddeley was appointed general manager.

Without the consent of the Vickers brothers Siddeley added his own name to the Wolseley nameplate but it was dropped on his departure.

Siddeley-Deasy

In 1909 J. D. Siddeley resigned from Wolseley and in 1910 took on management of The Deasy Motor Car Manufacturing Company, Limited. The shareholders were so pleased with his success in that post that on 7 November 1912 they unanimously agreed to change the company's name to The Siddeley-Deasy Motor Car Company Limited. Siddeley's name had been added to the product's radiator earlier in 1912. His cars began to use the slogan "As silent as the Sphinx", sporting a Sphinx as a bonnet ornament.

Armstrong Siddeley

In April 1919 Siddeley-Deasy was bought out by Armstrong Whitworth Development Company of Newcastle upon Tyne and in May 1919 became Armstrong Siddeley Motors Ltd, a subsidiary with J. D. Siddeley as managing director. In 1927, Armstrong Whitworth merged its heavy engineering interests with Vickers to form Vickers-Armstrongs. At this point, J. D. Siddeley brought Armstrong Siddeley and Armstrong Whitworth Aircraft into his control. In 1928, Armstrong Siddeley Holdings bought Avro from Crossley Motors. Also that year Siddeley partnered with Walter Gordon Wilson, inventor of the pre-selector gearbox, to create Improved Gears Ltd, which later became Self-Changing Gears – the gearbox that should be credited with enabling the marketing tagline "Cars for the daughters of gentlemen".

Armstrong Siddeley manufactured luxury cars, aircraft engines, and later, aircraft. In 1935, J. D. Siddeley's interests were purchased for £2 million by aviation pioneer Tommy Sopwith, owner of Hawker Aircraft, to form – along with the Gloster Aircraft Company and Air Training Services – Hawker Siddeley, a famous name in British aircraft production. Armstrong Whitworth Aircraft and Armstrong Siddeley Motors became subsidiaries of Hawker Siddeley, with Sopwith himself becoming the new chairman of Armstrong Siddeley Motors. At this time, there remained an  "unbroken business association" between the  Siddeley family and the Middleton-Joy family who were manufactures of   Filtrate Oil and had enjoyed considerable success in  car-racing rallies.

Armstrong Siddeley was merged with the aircraft engine business of Bristol Aeroplane Company (Bristol Aero Engines) to form Bristol Siddeley as part of an ongoing rationalisation under government influence of the British aircraft and aircraft engine manufacturers. Armstrong Siddeley produced their last cars in 1960. Bristol Siddeley and Rolls-Royce merged in 1966, the latter subsuming the former which remained for a while as an aircraft engine division within Rolls-Royce.

In June 1972, Rolls-Royce (1972) Ltd sold all the stock of spares plus all patents, specifications, drawings, catalogues and the name of Armstrong Siddeley Motors Ltd to the Armstrong Siddeley Owners Club Ltd. This meant that "Armstrong Siddeley" and "A-S Sphinx Logo" are trademarks and copyright of the Armstrong Siddeley Owners Club Ltd.

The "Siddeley" name survived a while longer in aviation, through Hawker Siddeley Aviation and Hawker Siddeley Dynamics. In 1977 they joined with others to become British Aerospace (BAe) which with further mergers is now BAE Systems.

Products

Motor cars

The first car produced from the union was a fairly massive machine, a 5-litre . A smaller 18 hp appeared in 1922 and a 2-litre 14 hp was introduced in 1923. 1928 saw the company's first 15 hp six; 1929 saw the introduction of a 12 hp vehicle. This was a pioneering year for the marque, during which it first offered the Wilson preselector gearbox as an optional extra; it became standard issue on all cars from 1933. In 1930 the company marketed four models, of 12, 15, 20, and 30 hp, the last costing £1450.

The company's rather staid image was endorsed during the 1930s by the introduction of a range of six-cylinder cars with ohv engines, though a four-cylinder 12 hp was kept in production until 1936.

In 1932 - or thereabouts, a line of special, rather more sporty designs was started which resulted in the Rally Tourer series. The aim was to help shake off the somewhat pedestrian image of what was in fact a rather advanced product. Of the 16 rally tourers built, many were used by the owners or senior directors, and were entered into various rallies, achieving some good results and making for good publicity. Only one of those 16 special cars is now known to exist: a 1933, Long-15 Rally Tourer which, according to the records, shared the same body as the 20 hp version (which had a slightly longer bonnet).

In 1933, the 5-litre six-cylinder Siddeley Special was announced, featuring a Hiduminium aluminium alloy engine; this model cost £950. Car production continued at a reduced rate throughout 1940, and a few were assembled in 1941.

The week that World War II ended in Europe, Armstrong Siddeley introduced its first post-war models; these were the Lancaster four-door saloon and the Hurricane drophead coupe. The names of these models echoed the names of aircraft produced by the Hawker Siddeley Group (the name adopted by the company in 1935) during the war. These cars all used a 2-litre six-cylinder (16 hp) engines, increased to 2.3-litre (18 hp) engines in 1949. From 1949 to 1952 two commercial variants of the 18 hp Whitleys were produced, primarily for export. The Utility Coupé was a conventional coupe utility style vehicle, while the Station Coupé was effectively a dual cab vehicle, although it still retained only two doors. However, it did have two rows of seating to accommodate up to four adults and the doors were larger to allow better access to the rear. From 1953 the company produced the Sapphire, with a 3.4-litre six-cylinder engine.

In 1956, the model range was expanded with the addition of the 234 (a 2.3-litre four-cylinder) and the 236 (with the older 2.3-litre six-cylinder engine). The Sapphire 346 sported a bonnet mascot in the shape of a sphinx with namesake Armstrong Siddeley Sapphire jet engines attached. The 234 and 236 Sapphires might have looked to some of marque's loyal customers like a radical departure from the traditional Armstrong Siddeley appearance. However, in truth, they were simply too conservative in a period of rapidly developing automotive design. If the "baby Sapphire" heralded the beginning of the end for Armstrong Siddeley, it was because Jaguar had launched the unitary-construction 2.4 saloon in 1955, which was quicker, significantly cheaper, and much better-looking than the 234 and 236.

The last new model produced by Armstrong Siddeley was 1958's Star Sapphire, with a 4-litre engine, and automatic transmission. The Armstrong Siddeley was a casualty of the 1960 merger with Bristol; the last car left the Coventry factory in 1960.

Model list
Cars produced by Armstrong Siddeley had designations that came from the tax horsepower rating of their engines.

A feature of many of their later cars was the option of an electrically controlled pre-selector gearbox.

Clubs

Like many British cars of this era, there are active owners' clubs supporting their continued use in several countries, e.g. the UK, Australia, New Zealand, the Netherlands and Germany. Armstrong Siddeley Owners Club Ltd has members worldwide and many members of the ASCC in Australia are resident overseas.

In the United Kingdom, ASOC publishes a monthly members magazine Sphinx. In Australia, the Armstrong Siddeley Car Club publishes Southern Sphinx six times a year. In the Netherlands, ASOC Dutch also publishes six times a year, and in New Zealand, Armstrong Siddeley Car Club in New Zealand Inc. publish Sphinx-NZ monthly.

Aircraft engines

Throughout the 1920s and 1930s, Armstrong Siddeley produced a range of low- and mid-power aircraft radial engines, all named after big cats. They also produced a tiny 2-cylinder engine called the Ounce, another name for the snow leopard, for ultralight aircraft.

The company started work on their first gas turbine engine in 1939, following the design pioneered at the Royal Aircraft Establishment by Alan Arnold Griffith. Known as the "ASX" for "Armstrong Siddeley eXperimental", the original pure-turbojet design was later adapted to drive a propeller, resulting in the "ASP". From then on, AS turbine engines were named after snakes. The Mamba and Double Mamba were turboprop engines, the latter being a complex piece of engineering with two side-by-side Mambas driving through a common gearbox, and could be found on the Fairey Gannet. The Python turboprop powered the Westland Wyvern strike aircraft. Further development of the Mamba removed the reduction gearbox to give the Adder turbojet.

Another pioneer in the production of the RAE engine design was Metrovick, who started with a design known as the Metrovick F.2. This engine never entered production, and Metrovick turned to a larger design, the Beryl, and then to an even larger design, the Sapphire. Armstrong Siddeley later took over the Sapphire design, and it went on to be one of the most successful 2nd generation jet engines, competing with the better-known Rolls-Royce Avon.

The company went on to develop an engine – originally for unmanned Jindivik target drones – called the Viper. This product was further developed by Bristol Siddeley and, later, Rolls-Royce and was sold in great numbers over many years. A range of rocket motors were also produced, including the Snarler and Stentor. The rocket development complemented that of Bristol, and Bristol Siddeley would become the leading British manufacturer of rocket engines for missiles.

Diesel engines

In 1946 Armstrong Siddeley produced their first diesel engines. They were medium-speed engines for industrial and agricultural use. Initially there was a single-cylinder engine producing  at 900 rpm and a twin-cylinder version. Each cylinder had a capacity of 988 cm3 (60.2 cubic inches). The power output and speed was progressively increased.

The engines were built at Armstrong Siddeley's factory at Walnut Street in Leicester until that factory closed in August 1957.  Production was transferred to the factory of Armstrong Siddeley (Brockworth) Ltd in Gloucestershire and in 1958 to the factory of Petters Limited at Staines, Middlesex. The engines built by Petters were designated AS1, AS2 and AS3 to distinguish them from that company's other products. Production ended in 1962 when Petters
introduced a replacement range of lightweight small high-speed air-cooled diesel engines.

In April 1958 the company obtained a licence to build the Maybach MD series high-speed diesel engines.  Several hundred were built by  Bristol Siddeley Engines Ltd after that company took over Armstrong Siddeley's manufacturing activities in 1959.

See also
 List of aircraft engines
 List of car manufacturers of the United Kingdom

Notes

References
Citations

Bibliography

Further reading
Robert Penn Bradly: Armstrong Siddeley, the Post War Cars; Motor Racing Publications, Croydon, 1989.
Robert Penn Bradly: The 346 Sapphire explored to great depth; Pimula PTY Pvt., Bardwell Park, NSW, 2008.
Bruce Lindsay: Armstrong Siddeley, the Sphinx with the heart of a lion; Lindsay family trust, Thailand, 2010.

External links

Armstrong Siddeley Owners Club for the cars
Non-affiliated Internet forum for Armstrong Siddeley enthusiasts world-wide
 

 
Defunct motor vehicle manufacturers of the United Kingdom
Defunct engineering companies of England
British companies established in 1919
Coventry motor companies
Rocket engine manufacturers of the United Kingdom
Defunct aircraft engine manufacturers of the United Kingdom
Vehicle manufacturing companies established in 1919